Samuel C. Randall (May 1837 – 1909) was a Michigan politician.  He was a thirty-third-degree Mason and a grand commander of Michigan Knights Templar.

Early life
Randall was born in Vestal, New York.  In the early 1850s, he came to Flint.  He served in the Union Army during the Civil War finishing up at the rank of captain. He was in the lumbering industry. Additional, he was a director and vice-president of National Bank of Flint.

Political life
He was elected as the Mayor of City of Flint in 1897 for a single 1-year term.

Post-political life
Randall died in 1909.

References

Mayors of Flint, Michigan
1837 births
1909 deaths
American Freemasons
19th-century American politicians